Cusano Milanino (local  ) is a town and comune in the Metropolitan City of Milan, in Lombardy. Cusano Milanino is about 13 kilometers far from the center of Milan.
 
It borders Paderno Dugnano, Cinisello Balsamo, Cormano and Bresso.

People
The 18th-century Italian economist and antiquarian Count Carli died in the town, then part of the Duchy of Milan, in 1795.

Cusano is also the birthplace of former soccer player and coach Giovanni Trapattoni

See also
United Left for Cusano Milanino

Cities and towns in Lombardy